Joseph Salvador Marino (born January 23, 1953) is an American prelate of the Roman Catholic Church who worked in the Vatican diplomatic service from 1988 to 2019 and then served as president of the Pontifical Ecclesiastical Academy until 2023. He became an archbishop in 2008 and represented the Holy See in Malaysia, East Timor, and Brunei for six years.

Biography

Early years 
Joseph Marino was born in Birmingham, Alabama, on January 23, 1953, one of three sons of Salvador Marino, an electrical engineer, and Josephine Marino. He grew up in the Ensley neighborhood of Birmingham and graduated from John Carroll High School in Birmingham in 1971. Marino earned degrees in philosophy and psychology from the University of Scranton in Scranton, Pennsylvania.

Priesthood 
Marino was ordained a priest by Bishop William Houck on August 25, 1979, for the Diocese of Birmingham. Marino received degrees in theology and biblical theology from the Pontifical Gregorian University while living at the Pontifical North American College from 1975 to 1980. Marino returned to Birmingham for four years of pastoral work as associate pastor at St. Paul's Cathedral Parish. In 1984 he entered the Pontifical Ecclesiastical Academy to prepare for a career in the diplomatic service while obtaining a Doctor of Canon Law degree from the Gregorian.

Diplomatic service 
Marino joined the diplomatic service on July 15, 1988. His early assignments included stints in the Philippines from 1988 to 1991, Uruguay from 1991 to 1994, and Nigeria from 1994 to 1997. From 1997 to 2004, Marino worked at the Secretariat of State in Rome, where he had responsibility for the Balkans countries. He participated as senior staff-member in two diplomatic missions: Cardinal Jean-Louis Tauran's  visit to Belgrade, Serbia, on April 1, 1999, that sought a resolution to the Kosovo War; and the meeting between U.S. President George W. Bush and Cardinal Pio Laghi in which Laghi unsuccessfully tried to dissuade Bush from invading Iraq in 2003.

Marino was working in the apostolic nunciature to the United Kingdom when, on January 12, 2008, Pope Benedict XVI named him a titular archbishop and apostolic nuncio to Bangladesh. He received his episcopal consecration from Cardinal Tauran on March 29, 2008, at the Cathedral of St. Paul in Birmingham.

On January 16, 2013, Pope Benedict appointed Marino as apostolic nuncio to Malaysia, apostolic nuncio to East Timor, and apostolic delegate to Brunei. He negotiated the 2015 accord between the Holy See and East Timor.

Pope Francis named Marino president of the Pontifical Ecclesiastical Academy on October 11, 2019. He is the second American to lead the school.

Pope Francis appointed Marino a member of the Dicastery for Evangelization on November 17, 2020.

On January 23, 2023, Pope Francis accepted his resignation as president of the Pontifical Ecclesiastical Academy.

See also
 List of heads of the diplomatic missions of the Holy See

Notes

References

External links 
Catholic Hierarchy: Archbishop Joseph Marino 

21st-century American Roman Catholic titular archbishops
1953 births
Living people
Apostolic Nuncios to Bangladesh
Apostolic Nuncios to East Timor
Apostolic Nuncios to Malaysia
University of Scranton alumni
Pontifical Gregorian University alumni
Pontifical Ecclesiastical Academy alumni
Presidents of the Pontifical Ecclesiastical Academy